CANADA is a creative production company headquartered in the Poblenou district in Barcelona, Spain with bases in London and Los Angeles. The company specialises in the global production and direction of music videos, commercials and short films. Works include music videos for Dua Lipa, Tame Impala and Rosalía, as well as TV spots for Louis Vuitton, IKEA, Coca-Cola, Mercedes-Benz and Apple among many others. CANADA is partnered with Diplomats in France, Rekorder in Germany and Pulse Films in North America.

Since its creation in 2008, CANADA has tried to cultivate an identity based on four fundamental ideas: the integrity of the work as a maximum value, the humour as an escape valve, the respect for tradition as a lure of modernity, and the purpose of achieving all this with as decent a praxis as possible. 

In 2021 CANADA decided to bet fully on sustainability, implementing a shooting work methodology to reduce the footprint of its activity on the planet.

History 
In 2008, directors Nicolás Méndez, Lope Serrano and Luis Cerveró, who worked from the same artistic perspective, decided to join forces to improve and develop their own initiative focused on the audiovisual sector after working for many years for different companies. Together with the directors, EP Oscar Romagosa and Global Head of Production Alba Barneda formed a key part of the CANADA collective. Founded during the 2008 worldwide economic crisis but specially for the Spanish financial crisis that lasted for almost six years starting in 2008, the company was formed in tough times, but in 2010 made a breakthrough by producing a music video for El Guincho's track "Bombay", which went viral on Vimeo and was named the best music video of the year by Rockdelux. This meteoric increase in popularity attracted projects from the United Kingdom, where they created work for bands like Scissor Sisters, The Vaccines and Battles.

After a few years represented by production company Partizan, the group decided to change partners, trying, in this way, to approach to the production sector and founded an office in London, UK. Before opening alone officially in Los Angeles, from December 2012 until June 2020 the company was represented in the United States by Roman Coppola, the founder and owner of The Directors Bureau.

In the mid-2010s the company helped to put local artists such as Bad Gyal, C. Tangana or Rosalía on the map internationally. After the latter released her hit single "Malamente" in May 2018 and its music video directed by CANADA received universal acclaim to the point that it was nominated for a Latin Grammy Award for Best Short Form Music Video and was named Video of the Year by Pitchfork, the company grew exponentially, directing at the end of the decade and beginning of the next one music videos for internationally known artists from Travis Scott to Dua Lipa. CANADA was also responsible for the commercials campaigns for brands such as Louis Vuitton, as well as for the 2020 Gaudí Cinema Awards spot.

Work

Accolades

References 

Mass media companies of Spain
Spanish companies established in 2008